In Cantonese phonology, a close relationship exists between the nasal codas (-m, -n, -ŋ) and the stop codas (-p, -t, -k). These two types of codas can also be classified into three homorganic pairs: the bilabial m/p, the dental n/t, and the velar ŋ/k. Their close association is best evidenced by the very fact that all stop sounds come from nasal sounds.

The phonological alternation 
Apart from phonetical association, the homorganic pairs are also semantically related. For some characters (or words) with syllables ending in nasals, there are semantically similar characters which have the hormorganic stops. For example, both dam3 揼 and “dap1” 耷 means ‘to hang down’. The initial consonants and the vowels of the alternating pair are identical while the terminal nasal /–m/ and stop /–p/ are a homorganic pair. In Cantonese phonology, this interesting phenomenon is known as nasal-stop alternation, mainly an alternation of homorganic consonants between nasal and stop finals. In other dialects, it could be oral-nasal or oral-stop alternation.

Regarding the initial consonants, a few items may alternate between aspirated and unaspirated initial stops, e.g. “kim4” 拑 ‘to pinch’ and  “gip6” 挟 ‘to squeeze together’. As for tones, high or low tones on syllables with nasal codas usually (but not always) correspond to high or low tones on syllables with stop codas, e.g. “ngam4” 吟 ‘to grumble’ has a low tone whereas “ngap1” 噏 ‘to babble’ has a high tone.

Many of these characters are colloquial verbs which lack standard Chinese characters as their written forms. For example, there is not a widely accepted character for “jip3”, ‘to pickle in salt’. Consequently, the hormorganic character “jim1” 腌 is also used to represent both syllables. The same is true for ‘‘doeŋ3’’ 啄 ‘to peck’ being used to stand for ‘‘doek1’’ as well.

As for their semantics or usage, the paired characters are not completely equivalent or interchangeable in every case. The colloquial verb “kam2”     冚 seems to be more commonly used than the corresponding “kap1” 扱, both meaning ‘to cover on top’. On the other hand, “fiŋ6” 捹 and “fik6” 扐 both mean ‘to throw away; to swing an object in the hand’ and are interchangeable; the same is also true for “niŋ1” 拎 and “nik1” 搦 ‘to carry in the hand’.

Different theories 
Most linguists believe that the syllables with nasal codas are the more basic originals while the stops are the colloquial variants. A few opine that there are an equal number of word pairings that are originated from the syllables with stop codas. However, it is generally agreed that the usage of the nasal members are less restricted than their stop counterparts.

Other linguists regard the alternation between homorganic final consonants in pairs of semantically-related words as a feature widely found among languages of Southeast Asia as well as south China (Chuang-chia and Hmong for example). Such paired words belong to a “word-family”, a term first used by Bernhard Karlgren (1934) to refer to sets of words with similar (but not identical) sound in Archaic Chinese that were related in meaning, representing relics of morphological processes. Similarly, Bauer notes that the Cantonese phenomenon is believed to be a remnant of an ancient word-derivation process, now no longer productive, in which different types of suffixes (causative and transitive) were attached to lexical roots.

Some examples 
In the Cantonese syllabary, there are about 50 pairs of such characters that show alternation between homorganic nasal and stop codas. The following is a list of some examples for reference:

References

External links
 Modern Cantonese Phonology by Robert S. Bauer and Paul K. Benedict (Ohio State University)
 Homorganic Nasal/Stop Alterations in Cantonese by Benjamin K. T'sou (University of Hong Kong)

Cantonese phonology
Cantonese language